Dai (or DAI, formerly Sai or SAI) is a stablecoin on the Ethereum blockchain whose value is kept as close to one United States dollar (USD) as possible through a system of smart contracts and the decentralized participants those contracts incentivize to perform maintenance and governance functions. Dai is maintained and regulated by MakerDAO, a decentralized autonomous organization (DAO) composed of the owners of its governance token, MKR, who may propose and vote on changes to certain parameters in its smart contracts in order to ensure the stability of Dai.

Together, Dai and MakerDAO are considered the first example of decentralized finance to receive significant adoption.

Overview 
Dai is created from an overcollateralized loan and repayment process facilitated by MakerDAO's smart contracts in the form of a decentralized application. Users who deposit Ether (or other cryptocurrencies accepted as collateral) are able to borrow against the value of their deposits and receive newly generated Dai. The minimum collateralization ratio for Ether is currently set at 150%, which means a depositor of $150 worth of Ether may borrow up to 100 Dai (worth roughly $100). If the collateralization ratio of a loan falls below the minimum ratio, anyone may call a function on the contract to liquidate the loan and receive a percentage of the collateral as a reward.

Upon repayment of the loan and its accrued interest, the returned Dai is automatically destroyed, and the collateral is made available for withdrawal. In this way the USD value of Dai can be said to be backed by the USD value of the underlying collateral held by MakerDAO's smart contracts. By controlling the types of accepted collateral, minimum collateralization ratios, and the interest rates for borrowing or storing Dai, MakerDAO is able to control the amount of Dai in circulation, and thus its value.

The power to propose and implement changes to such variables is granted, through code, to holders of the MKR token. Owners of the governance token are able to vote on proposed modifications in equal proportion to the amount of tokens they hold. The MKR token also serves as an investment in the MakerDAO system. Added interest that borrowers pay back, on top of their loan's principal, is used to buy up MKR tokens from the market and burn them, taking them permanently out of circulation. This mechanism aims to make MKR deflationary in correlation to the revenues from lending Dai.

History 
MakerDAO was formed in 2014 by Danish entrepreneur Rune Christensen.

On December 18, 2017, Dai and its associated smart contracts were officially launched on the main Ethereum network. The price of Dai was successfully kept close to one US dollar during its first year of existence, even though the price of Ether, the only collateral available at the time, declined by more than 80% during the same time period.

In September 2018, venture capital firm Andreessen Horowitz invested $15 million in MakerDAO by purchasing 6% of all MKR tokens.

In 2018, MakerDAO formed the Maker Foundation, run from Copenhagen, which serves to help bootstrap the ecosystem by, for example, writing code needed for the platform to function and adapt.

In 2019, MakerDAO experienced internal struggle over whether it should integrate more with the traditional financial system. Christensen wanted greater regulatory compliance to allow for assets besides cryptocurrency to serve as collateral for Dai. The struggle led to the departure of MakerDAO's CTO.

In March 2020, as a result of extraordinary market volatility at the onset of the COVID-19 pandemic, Dai experienced a deflationary deleveraging spiral that, at its peak, caused it to trade for up to USD $1.11 before returning to its intended $1.00 valuation.

Name 
According to Rune Christensen, the name of the cryptocurrency is based on the Chinese character 貸, which he translated as "to lend or to provide capital for a loan".

See also 

 Cryptocurrency
 Stablecoin
 Decentralized finance (DeFi)
 Decentralized autonomous organization (DAO)

Notes

References

External links 
 makerdao.com

Ethereum tokens
Cryptocurrency projects